Gabriela Vránová (27 July 1939, Nové Mesto nad Váhom – 16 June 2018, Prague) was a Czech actress and voice actress.

She was best known for her roles in the films The Treasure of a Byzantine Merchant (1966) and Hop – a je tu lidoop (1978), and the television series Sňatky z rozumu (1968), Chalupáři (1974–75), Thirty Cases of Major Zeman, and F. L. Věk, among others. From 1959 till 2012, she appeared on numerous stage productions at the Vinohrady Theatre.

She was also known for voice acting. She regularly dubbed actresses such as Marilyn Monroe, Elizabeth Taylor, Catherine Deneuve or Jeanne Moreau.

References

1939 births
2018 deaths
People from Nové Mesto nad Váhom
Czech film actresses
Czech television actresses
Czech stage actresses